Istok is a town in Kosovo.

Istok may also refer to:
 Istok, Gmina Dubicze Cerkiewne in Podlaskie Voivodeship (north-east Poland)
 Istok, Gmina Narew in Podlaskie Voivodeship (north-east Poland)
 Istok (magazine), a Russian-language online publication of the Islamic State
 Istok, a brand of Russian vodka
 Justin I, Byzantine Emperor, whose original, Thracian name was Istok

See also
 ISTTOK, an abbreviation for the "Instituto Superior Técnico TOKamak"